Gerlinde Massing (born 8 January 1951) is an Austrian sprinter. She competed in the women's 4 × 400 metres relay at the 1972 Summer Olympics.

References

1951 births
Living people
Athletes (track and field) at the 1972 Summer Olympics
Austrian female sprinters
Olympic athletes of Austria
Place of birth missing (living people)
Olympic female sprinters